Thomas Vincent may refer to:

Thomas Vincent (minister) (1634–1678), English Puritan minister
Thomas Vincent (MP) (1544–1613), MP for Poole
Thomas Vincent (MP died 1700) (c.1660–1700), MP for Reigate
Thomas Vincent (director) (born 1964), French film director
Tom Vincent (born 1956), American comic book artist 
Tom Vincent (pianist) (born 1969), Australian jazz pianist